Palaquium elegans is a tree in the family Sapotaceae.

Description
The twigs are brownish. Inflorescences bear up to 10 flowers.

Distribution and habitat
Palaquium elegans is endemic to Borneo, where it is confined to Sarawak. Its habitat is mixed dipterocarp forests.

Conservation
Palaquium elegans has been assessed as endangered on the IUCN Red List. The species is threatened by logging and land conversion to palm oil plantations.

References

elegans
Endemic flora of Borneo
Trees of Borneo
Flora of Sarawak
Plants described in 1960